The Reclaim Party is a right-wing political party in the United Kingdom. It was launched in 2020 by British actor and political activist Laurence Fox, with funding from Jeremy Hosking.

Founding
The party was first registered on 13 March 2019 by Jeremy Hosking as Brexit Express.

In September 2020, Fox attracted funding for a new political party, provisionally called Reclaim, and dubbed "UKIP for culture". In October 2020 the party change its leader from Jeremy Hosking to Laurence Fox. It emerged in the same month that the party name had yet to be successfully registered with the Electoral Commission as there was a naming conflict with the "Reclaim Project" of Manchester, an established charity giving opportunities to working-class children. In February 2021, the party changed its registered name from Brexit Express, to The Reclaim Party.

In December 2021, newspapers reported Hosking would continue to fund The Reclaim Party.

2021 London mayoral election 
In March 2021, Fox announced he would stand in the London mayoral elections, in order to "fight against extreme political correctness" and to "end the Met's obsession with diversity and inclusivity".  His candidacy was endorsed by Reform UK, who stood aside for him in the election, and Nigel Farage. The major source of Fox's campaign funds was Brexit backer Jeremy Hosking, who, in the first quarter of 2021, gave The Reclaim Party more than £1,000,000 in cash and services. 

In the mayoral election, Fox finished in sixth place with 47,634 votes (1.9 per cent), losing his £10,000 election deposit.

2021 Scottish Parliament election
The party stood one candidate, Leo Kearse, in the Scottish Parliament election, held in May 2021. In Glasgow Pollok, Kearse received 114 votes (0.3 per cent).

North Shropshire by-election
Martin Daubney, deputy leader of the party from 2021 until August 2022, was the party's candidate in the 2021 North Shropshire by-election. Daubney is a former Brexit Party Member of the European Parliament (MEP) from 2019 to 2020, and a former journalist and editor.  He finished seventh with 375 votes (0.98 per cent), losing his deposit.

During the by-election campaign, a Market Drayton town councillor defected to Reclaim; this was the party's first representative in UK local government.

References

2020 establishments in the United Kingdom
Political parties established in 2020
Conservative parties in the United Kingdom